The 1983 NAIA Division I football season was the 28th season of college football sponsored by the NAIA, was the 14th season of play of the NAIA's top division for football.

The season was played from August to November 1983 and culminated in the 1983 NAIA Champion Bowl, played this year on December 17, 1983 at Ralph Stocker Stadium in Grand Junction, Colorado on the campus of Mesa College (now Colorado Mesa).

Carson–Newman defeated Mesa in the Champion Bowl, 36–28, to win their first NAIA national title.

Conference changes
 This is the final season that the Central Intercollegiate Athletic Association is officially recognized as an NAIA football conference.

Conference standings

Conference champions

Postseason

See also
 1983 NAIA Division II football season
 1983 NCAA Division I-A football season
 1983 NCAA Division I-AA football season
 1983 NCAA Division II football season
 1983 NCAA Division III football season

References

 
NAIA Football National Championship